Otar Lordkipanidze (October 30, 1930 – May 19, 2002) was a Georgian archaeologist best known for his studies of the ancient sites of Colchis and Iberia and the presence of the Achaemenid culture in the South Caucasus. He was the father of the Georgian paleoanthropologist David Lordkipanidze.

References

1930 births
2002 deaths
Archaeologists from Georgia (country)
20th-century archaeologists